Geitodoris heathi, common name "Heath's dorid", is a species of colorful sea slug, a dorid nudibranch, a shell-less marine gastropod mollusc in the family Dorididae.

Distribution
This species of dorid nudibranch lives in the eastern Pacific, from Alaska to Baja California.

Description
This nudibranch grows to be about 45 mm, or almost 2 inches in length. It can be white or yellow or even a sort of pinkish color, and sometimes has small dark spots.

Notes

References

 http://www.marinespecies.org/ search term Geitodoris accessed 4 March 2010

Books
 Behrens David W., 1980, Pacific Coast Nudibranchs: a guide to the opisthobranchs of the northeastern Pacific, Sea Challenger Books, California

External links

Dorididae
Gastropods described in 1905